The  is a kei truck and microvan, built and sold in Japan by Japanese automaker Mitsubishi Motors since 1966. In Japan, it was sold at a specific retail chain called Galant Shop. It was also sold by China Motor Corporation (CMC) in Taiwan as the CMC Veryca, starting in 1985. A battery electric model of the Minicab, called the Minicab MiEV, is sold in the Japanese market since December 2011. 

Since February 2014, the Mitsubishi Minicab is a rebadged Suzuki Carry, except for the Minicab MiEV.

First generation

The Minicab cabover pickup truck was launched in 1966 to replace the 360 trucklet, which by this time had adopted the same model name as the Minica sedan. Codenamed LT30, it shared the sedan's air cooled, two-stroke, 359-cc ME24 engine, and was available with cargo gates on three sides to simplify loading and unloading. A van version was introduced in 1968, available in four different equipment levels. The T30 truck was replaced in 1971 by the new Minicab EL, but the van was kept in production (now also called the Minicab EL) and updated with a dummy grille and headlight surround. The air-cooled T30V with its  engine was kept in production until 1976, with no further modifications except a 1974 adjustment to fit larger license plates. About 224,766 first-generation Minicabs were built.

Second generation

In 1971, the Minicab underwent its first model change, with the Minicab EL offering a new interior and a longer cargo bed. Called the T130, it was only available in truck form, with the old LT30 van soldiering on until the third generation was introduced in 1976. The ME24 engine produced  in all T130 versions, which included a standard bed and a dropside bed with either Standard, DeLuxe, or Super DeLuxe equipment. Ride quality was improved with the adoption of a front wishbone and rear leaf spring suspension. The EL received all new bodywork with tiny rectangular headlamps.

A panel van was added to the Minicab truck lineup in 1972, when it also became the Minicab W with the new water-cooled 2G10 engine (hence the W). This model carries the T131 chassis code, and is easily identified by its reworked front end, reverting to round headlights. It also carries a prominent "W" on the front, beneath the left headlight. The grille was altered and the headlights made larger, yet in 1973, with the "W" replaced by a "Minicab" script. Nearly 210,000 second-generation Minicabs were built, making it the slowest-selling generation. The third generation, however, was mostly a heavily modified T130.

Third generation

In April 1976, the third-generation Minicab was introduced. In keeping with the changes in vehicle tax regulations, the Minicab 5 (L012) featured an increase in length, and adopted the enlarged 471-cc Vulcan S engine from the car line, still with the same maximum power as the 360. It also incorporated new features such as a windscreen defroster, a central console box, and a central ventilation system. This engine did not take full advantage of the new regulations, which allowed up to 550 cc, and was only used in a short-lived group of interim models.

It was modified again in April 1977, when it was widened and received a full 546-cc engine and the new name "Minicab Wide 55" (L013). It continued until 1979, when the grille was altered and power was increased by two horsepower. For some export markets, such as Chile and Argentina, this version was known as Mitsubishi L100, correlating with the L200 truck and L300 vans. This model was thoroughly updated in 1981, when the engine was changed to the timing belt-equipped G23B, producing the same  as the version it replaced. At the same time, the name was changed back to simply "Minicab", dropping "Wide 55" from the name as the market was now considered to be aware of the increase in body size and engine capacity. At the same time, the chassis code was switched to L015. Beginning in November 1981. the export-market L100 received the 2G24, a 644 -cc version of the new engine. These cars received small "650" badging at the front.

In 1982, the flat-floor van model adopted a double-walled construction to offer a flat, open cargo area. The four-wheel drive (4WD) model was also introduced in 1982, when the range received a minor facelift. Overall, 768,393 third-generation Minicabs (L012, L013, L015) were built.

In China the third generation was built and sold as both the Shenwei SYW 1010 and as the Liuzhou Wuling LZ 110. The LZ 110 was available as a van or as a truck, and had Mitsubishi's larger 800 cc engine as fitted to certain other Mitsubishi export versions.

Fourth generation

Further model range updates have been in parallel with the Minica. In June 1984, the range was updated, becoming the fourth-generation U11/12 series (2WD/4WD). Although improvements were made to enhance the Minicab's commercial applications, the most noticeable changes were made to support personal leisure activities. Angular headlamps played an important role in the Minicab's styling, along with larger windows to improve visibility. A rear window wiper, electronic locking rear gate, and power brakes were adopted. Mitsubishi offered 15 front- and 4WD van model variations and 10 truck variations. Better-equipped, more passenger-oriented four-seater van models were initially sold as Minicab Estate; in January 1989 this was renamed the Minicab Bravo. This generation (collectively referred to as the U10) was built until November 1990, eventually reaching the U19 chassis code. In total, 707,348 fourth-generation Minicabs were built.

Additional models went on sale in February 1985, and it received a small facelift in September of that year. In February 1986, the van range received two additions: a 2WD automatic and a dual-range, five-speed 4WD model. In June 1987, a more thorough change took place as the two-cylinder Vulcan-II engine was replaced with the three-cylinder Cyclone (3G81). A supercharged model was added to the lineup, which was now called U14/U15. In August 1988 there was a facelift, and in April 1989 the NX and Bravo AX models were added (both with four-wheel drive). In January 1990, naturally aspirated models were upgraded to the 657 cc 3G83 engine (U18/U19), as a result of new regulations, while a minor facelift with bigger front and rear bumpers increased the length marginally. The car did not take full advantage of the new rules, as it was a rather short-lived interim model, and supercharged versions continued to use the smaller engine until they were discontinued in 1990. Those received a "G" at the end of the chassis codes, meaning that a 4WD supercharged van would now be the U15VG, and so on.

The estate models featured the first sliding sunroof in their class. In 1987, the Minicab became the first manufacturer to offer a supercharged kei truck. It was also marketed in the United States for off-road purposes only, where it was sold as the "Mighty Mits". These offered left-hand drive and a  version of the 550-cc 3G81 engine. A variety of truck versions was on offer, with or without doors, with all-terrain wheels, and with an available high roof.

In China the fourth generation Minicab was built and sold as the Wuling LZW 1010 for the commercial variants and the Wuling LZW 6330 for the passenger variant from 1990 to 2009.

Mitsubishi Jetstar

From 1987 until 1990, a wider version with a longer rear end was built and sold in Indonesia as the "Jetstar". Rumor said, the name of "Jetstar" came from the combination of "jet" (Daihatsu Hijet) and "star" (Mitsubishi's three-diamond emblem that looks like a star).

This Indonesian built Minicab was powered by a 993-cc, three-cylinder Daihatsu engine (CB20) from the Daihatsu Hijet. This occurred because in 1981, the government declared that no engine built in Indonesia was to be of less than 1.0-L displacement by 1985. As the result, manufacturers of local microvans and trucks scrambled to install larger engines. At that time, though, Mitsubishi did not have an engine of suitable displacement and instead used an engine from Daihatsu. In 1991 the Jetstar was replaced by the Mitsubishi Colt T120SS, based on the eighth-generation Suzuki Carry.

CMC Varica and CMC Veryca

In Taiwan, long-wheelbase iterations of the fourth-generation Minicab were also available with a variety of bodywork. The Varica's nose was also extended somewhat.

The CMC Varica was imported to the United States by Cushman and sold as the Type G, also known as the Cushman White Truck or White Van.

Fifth generation

A larger and completely redesigned Minicab (U40-series) was released in February 1991 to take full advantage of tax regulations allowing for increased dimensions and engine capacity of kei cars. Three new 660-cc engines were introduced - a four-valve, SOHC unit; a five-valve, DOHC unit (Bravo only); and a two-valve, SOHC unit. The high-roof truck model was discontinued; Van models were two-seaters only in the Japanese market. Four-speed manual transmissions were typical on the Minicab Truck at first, with the five-speed being reserved for the top TL model. A three-speed automatic was also optional on the Minicab TD truck. Across the range, 66 model variations were possible. Vans and Trucks originally shared a taillight design. The two-valve engine was only available in the absolute base model, the TU, which was also the only version equipped with 10-inch wheels and drum brakes up front as well as at the rear. The Minicab received minor improvements in January 1992 in the form of better waterproofing for the electrics and in January 1993 the five-speed manual became standard fitment on all models except the base version with 10-inch wheels.

In February 1994, the fifth generation Minicab received some exterior changes. The headlamps were changed to SAE standard square lamps, replacing the original round units. The trip meter which had been installed on the top grade versions (TL truck, CL van) was discontinued, leaving only an odometer. In addition, the tail lamp design of the van has been changed to a dedicated original type. The Bravo received a new halogen headlight design fitted into the same opening as those of the Minicab, but cut off at the bottom. In January 1996 the Minicab underwent a second minor change and was now equipped with the same halogen lights as used on the Bravo since 1994 (some work-oriented versions like the dump truck and the panel van continued to use the earlier design). The steering wheel was changed to a two-spoke unit borrowed from the base Minica. The very basic Minicab truck Type V arrived in May 1996, using the same carburetted four-valve engine, 12-inch wheels, and front disc brakes as the rest of the range but with the earlier, rectangular headlights (1994 design) and a four-speed manual transmission on both the 2WD and the 4WD models. Simultaneously, to allow the price to be kept down during a time of economic stagnation, the Type V reverted to the original carburetted two-valve engine and was now also available as a Van. In all, 723,772 fifth-generation Minicabs were built.

Bravo
The new Bravo (no longer using the "Minicab" moniker) came fitted with unusual concave, oval headlights. At the time of introduction, the lower end of the Bravo range received the 12-valve carburetted engine as also used in the Minicab trucks and vans, while more expensive versions were equipped with a fuel injected version with five valves per cylinder which was never offered on the commercial line. Outputs are  respectively. In January 1992, a turbocharged,  version of the 15-valve engine was made available in the new MZ-G and MZ-R models. In January 1994, the new 4A30 four-cylinder engine replaced the 3G83 in all but the lowest-priced versions, which kept the old carburetted 12-valve version. The 16-valve single-cam model was available either carburetted or fuel injected and produces either . The twin-cam, 20-valve "GT" model was only offered with fuel injection, turbocharger, and an intercooler but remained at the  limit to which Japanese manufacturers had agreed. From August 1997, the Bravo lineup also included a new variant, the retro-styled Bravo Route 66.

Sixth generation

The sixth-generation Minicab (U60-series) was introduced in 1999, now sporting a new semi-front design. By April 1999, a "wagon" version called the Town Box was introduced; 419,070 petrol-engined U60s were built, but the Minicab MiEV remains in production as of 2020.

Minicab MiEV

Mitsubishi began testing of the Minicab MiEV in Japan in October 2010. In January 2011, Mitsubishi stated that it would add an electric version of Minicab, Minicab MiEV, for sale in Japan in the third quarter of 2011. A December 2011 launch was later planned.

The drivetrain and key components were borrowed from the marque's i-MiEV kei car, with the motor retuned to improve low-end torque for commercial vehicle use; charging time ranged from 15 to 35 minutes (to 80% state of charge, using DC supply at 50 kW for the 10.5 kW-hr and 16.0 kW-hr battery options, respectively) to 14–21 hours (to full, using conventional AC wall supply at 100 V / 15 A).

Mitsubishi picked up early orders for 100 units from major delivery company Yamato Transport in May of that year. The commercial-use electric vehicle is available with a lower range than that of the i-MiEV, in a bid to reduce costs. The Minicab MiEV was released in the domestic market in December 2011, and a total of 4,544 units have been sold in Japan through October 2013. A truck version of the Minicab MiEV was launched in January 2013, and sales totaled 536 units through October 2013. In 2019, Japan Post ordered a total of 1,200 units, to be put into service by the end of March 2021.

While the Mitsubishi MiEV was discontinued, the Minicab MiEV remained in production as of 2021. In February 2023, Mitsubishi announced plans to produce the model in Indonesia starting 2024.

Nissan Clipper
Mitsubishi also manufactured a badge-engineered version of the Minicab pickup on behalf of Nissan, which sold it as the Nissan Clipper (a badge originally used on a larger range of Prince and Nissan trucks). The trucks were called NT100 Clippers, and vans  were NV100s. The Minicab/Clipper competed in the Japanese market with the Honda Acty, Subaru Sambar, Daihatsu Hijet, and Suzuki Carry. The Minicab and Clipper were both facelifted in July 2012, to meet new safety regulations. Following Mitsubishi's announcement that they would stop manufacturing their own kei trucks for 2014, Nissan stopped selling the rebadged Minicab in November 2013. Since then, both Mitsubishi and Nissan rely on the Suzuki Carry/Every range for their entry in the keitora class.

Gallery

Seventh generation

The seventh-generation Mitsubishi Minicab is a rebadged Suzuki Carry or Every; it was introduced in February 2014. The vans (DS64V) were available for only one year, as the Every on which they were based was just about to be replaced. Mitsubishi also offered the more passenger-oriented Suzuki Every Wagon (same chassis code), differing mostly in terms of equipment and engines, but with a redesigned rear, reviving the Mitsubishi Town Box badge, which had lain dormant for a few years. The truck range (chassis code DS16T) remains in production as a result of Suzuki deciding to let the two model lines diverge.

Eighth generation

The eighth-generation Mitsubishi Minicab (DS17V, van only) was introduced in March 2015, and is also a rebadged Suzuki Every. The Every Wagon-based Town Box was changed simultaneously.

References

External links

 Mitsubishi Minicab official site (Japanese)

Minicab
Vehicles introduced in 1966
1970s cars
1980s cars
1990s cars
2000s cars
2010s cars
2020s cars
Kei trucks
Microvans
Rear-wheel-drive vehicles
All-wheel-drive vehicles
OEM Suzuki vehicles
Production electric cars
Electric vans
Cab over vehicles